Den sjunde vågen (The Seventh Wave) is the second studio album by Swedish singer-songwriter Marie Fredriksson, originally released on 17 February 1986 on LP and Cassette by EMI Sweden, with a CD release following on 29 October 1986. The album was a commercial success upon release, peaking at number six and spending almost three months on the Swedish Albums Chart. "Den bästa dagen" ("The Best Day") and "Silver i din hand" ("Silver in Your Hand") preceded the album as single releases: the b-sides from these singles served as bonus tracks when the record was later issued on CD.

The album was remastered and reissued in 2002 as part of Fredriksson's 24-bit HDCD box set, Kärlekens guld. This edition included Fredriksson's previously unreleased recording of "Det finns så mycket man inte känner till" ("There Is Much You Do Not Know") as a bonus track, a version of which had originally been released as a single in 1988 by Swedish pop singer Anna Book.

Background and recording
Marie Fredriksson and her then-boyfriend, producer Lars-Göran "Lasse" Lindbom, wrote the majority of songs found on Den sjunde vågen while on vacation in the Canary Islands in the summer of 1985. During the vacation, Fredriksson finished reading Henri Charrière's autobiographical novel Papillon, the plot of which inspired the album's title; the book describes how Charrière observed that waves "come in a series of seven – the last being the biggest and the strongest." The couple returned to Sweden to record the album at EMI Studios in Stockholm between June and September 1985. It was recorded with a predominantly new group of musicians; many of the people who performed on her 1984 debut solo album, Het vind, also performed on Per Gessle's debut solo album. Fredriksson and Gessle would go on to form pop duo Roxette in 1986.

Release and reception
The album was preceded by the release of two singles in Sweden: "Den bästa dagen" on 4 October 1985 and "Silver i din hand" on 8 January 1986, both of which failed to chart. Despite this, the album was an immediate commercial success upon release, spending over three months on the Swedish Album Chart, where it peaked at number six on its third week. Upon release, multiple Swedish journalists commented that Den sjunde vågen was "just another divorce album", as Fredriksson and Lindbom ended their romantic relationship partway through its recording. However, Fredriksson denied this, saying that only one song on the album, "När du såg på mej" ("When You Looked At Me") – which features Lindbom as a co-lead vocalist – relates to the disintegration of their relationship.

The record was promoted by Fredriksson's second solo tour, which began on 28 February 1986 and was initially scheduled to run until 30 April, although it was eventually extended until the end of May due to high ticket sales. Over the course of the tour, two songs from the album – the title track and "Mot okända hav" ("Toward Unknown Seas") – became top ten hits on Svensktoppen, Sweden's airplay-based chart. In July, she was a featured performer on the inaugural edition of the "Badrock Tour". This two-week festival was founded by former Blue Swede vocalist Björn Skifs, and took place at the Borgholm Castle ruin on the Swedish Baltic Sea island of Öland. Roxette's debut studio album, Pearls of Passion, was released on 31 October 1986; two days earlier, Den sjunde vågen was issued on CD for the first time, containing b-sides from the two commercial singles as bonus tracks. The success of the album in her home country led to Fredriksson winning her first Rockbjörnen award in 1986, for Best Swedish Female. She would go on to win the award a total of four times: the most of any artist in the awards' history.

Formats and track listings
All songs written by Marie Fredriksson and Lasse Lindbom, except where noted.

Personnel
Credits adapted from the liner notes of Den sjunde vågen.

Musicians
 Marie Fredriksson – vocals and recorder
 Per Andersson – backing vocals, synthesizer and drums
 Staffan Astner – guitars
 Richard "Ricky" Johansson – bass guitar and electric upright bass
 Leif Larson – piano, keyboards and synthesizer
 Lars-Göran "Lasse" Lindbom – lead vocals , backing vocals, acoustic guitar, engineering and production

Additional musicians
 Marianne Flynner – backing vocals 
 Henrik Janson – guitar and synthesizer 
 Jan "Nane" Kvillsäter – electric  and acoustic guitars 
 Tove Naess – backing vocals 
 Tommy Nilsson – backing vocals 
 Mikael Rickfors – backing vocals 
 Reg Ward – saxophone 
 Basse Wickman – backing vocals 

Technical personnel
 Kjell Andersson – sleeve design
 Calle Bengtsson – photography
 Björn Boström – engineering

Charts and certifications

Weekly charts

Certifications

}

Release history

References

External links

1986 albums
Marie Fredriksson albums